Pallipattu taluk is a taluk of Tiruvallur district of the Indian state of Tamil Nadu. The headquarters of the taluk is the town of Pallipattu.

Demographics
According to the 2011 census, the taluk of Pallipattu had a population of 211,689 with 106,744 males and 104,945 females. There were 983 women for every 1,000 men. The taluk had a literacy rate of 67.7%. Child population in the age group below 6 was 11,666 Males and 10,771 Females.

Taluk Name : Pallipattu taluk
Biggest Town in the Taluk: Pothatturpettai
Blocks : Pallipattu and RK Pet 
District : Thiruvallur 
State : Tamil Nadu
Language : Tamil 
Time zone: IST (UTC+5:30) 
Telephone Code / Std440:

References 

Taluks of Tiruvallur district